Hiland (also Poison Creek Station, Woolton, or Wolton) is an unincorporated community in western Natrona County, Wyoming, United States.  It lies along the concurrent U.S. Routes 20 and 26, west of the city of Casper, the county seat of Natrona County. Its elevation is 6,004 feet (1,830 m). Although the Hiland post office closed in 2014, it retains a ZIP code of 82638. Hiland is so named because it formed the highest elevation point within the Wyoming portion of the Chicago and Northwestern Railroad: it was originally named Woolton at its founding, with the spelling later changed to Wolton until 1914, when most of Wolton's population moved to Arminto, the new, nearby railhead, and the remaining citizens renamed the town Hiland. As of 2014, the town consisted only of a bar catering to bikers, and an adjacent house.

References

Unincorporated communities in Natrona County, Wyoming
Unincorporated communities in Wyoming